Jacqueline (Jackie) Taylor  is a Scottish physician and Professor at the University of Glasgow. She is the former President of the Royal College of Physicians and Surgeons of Glasgow and the Cardiovascular Section of the British Geriatrics Society. She was elected a Member of the British Empire in the 2023 New Year Honours.

Early life and education 
Taylor studied medicine at the University of Glasgow Medical School. She specialised in heart failure.

Research and career 
Taylor was made a consultant for medicine at the Glasgow Royal Infirmary in 1997. She specialised in medicine for the elderly. Here she developed the stroke service and heart failure clinic. In 2018 Taylor was elected President of the Royal College of Physicians and Surgeons of Glasgow, and led the college throughout the COVID-19 pandemic. She was the first woman to hold such a position, and emphasised the need for hospitals to listen to consultant advice to optimise patient care. Even prior to the pandemic, Taylor explained that doctors were struggling under considerable pressures at work. She formed a partnership with the Ministry of Higher Education and Scientific Research in the Arab Republic of Egypt to enhance medical and dental care in Egypt.

After 38 years of service, Taylor retired from the National Health Service in 2021. She was made Chair of the Scottish Government National Audiology Review in 2022. In this capacity she looked to improve audiology services across Scotland.

Awards and honours 

 2021 Honorary doctorate from the Glasgow Caledonian University
 2023 Member of the British Empire

Select publications

References 

Living people
Academics of the University of Glasgow
National Health Service people
20th-century Scottish medical doctors
21st-century Scottish medical doctors
Scottish women medical doctors
Members of the Order of the British Empire
Year of birth missing (living people)
20th-century women physicians
21st-century women physicians